"Talking in Your Sleep" is a  song by American rock band the Romantics. It became the band's most successful single in the US, reaching number three on the Billboard Hot 100 in early 1984, and became a UK hit in August that year for British group Bucks Fizz. The song is in natural minor.

Song history 
The song appeared on the Romantics' 1983 album In Heat and was the Romantics' biggest chart hit, garnering substantial radio airplay and a million in US 45 RPM single sales. Nemperor Records also released an extended 12" dance mix, which was timed at 5:56.

The song reached number three – where it held for three weeks – on the Billboard Hot 100 in early 1984. It also went to number one on the Dance/Disco Top 80 chart, as well as hitting No. 2 on Billboards Album Rock Tracks chart.

In Australia, "Talking in Your Sleep" climbed to number 14 on the Australian Singles Chart (Kent Music Report).

Music video 
The song's music video, widely aired at the time on MTV and elsewhere, featured the band performing while surrounded by standing, but seemingly sleeping, women who were dressed in lingerie, pajamas, and other sleepwear.

Chart performance

Weekly charts

Year-end charts

Bucks Fizz version 

The Romantics' single was unsuccessful in the United Kingdom, but in August 1984, the song became well-known when pop group Bucks Fizz covered it. This version reached number 15 on the UK Singles Chart. It was produced by Andy Hill and featured on their fourth album, I Hear Talk. The single was the group's first for nine months and became their biggest hit since "When We Were Young", a year previously. It was also released as a limited-edition EP, which included the live tracks "Twentieth Century Hero" and a cover of Chris de Burgh's "Don't Pay the Ferryman". The B-side, "Don't Think You're Fooling Me" was written and produced by band member Bobby G.

Track listing 
7" vinyl
 "Talking in Your Sleep" (Canler / Skill / Palmar / Solley / Marinos) – (4.18)
 "Don't Think You're Fooling Me" (Bobby G) – (3.50)

12" vinyl
 "Talking in Your Sleep" (Extended Mix) – (8.39)
 "Don't Think You're Fooling Me" – (3.50)

Limited edition EP
 "Talking in Your Sleep – (4.18)
 "Don't Think You're Fooling Me" – (3.50)
 "Twentieth Century Hero" (Live) (Andy Hill / Pete Sinfield) – (3.20)
 "Don't Pay the Ferryman" (Live) (Chris de Burgh) – (3.56)

Weekly charts

Sampling
Canadian singer The Weeknd interpolated the chorus of "Talking in Your Sleep" in his song "Secrets" from his 2016 album, Starboy. It peaked at No. 47 in both the UK and US, while also charting in other territories.

References

1983 songs
1983 singles
1984 singles
The Romantics songs
Bucks Fizz songs
RPM Top Singles number-one singles
RCA Records singles
Songs about dreams
Songs about sleep